Mourir d'amour

Mourir d'amour (Ma mort a les yeux bleus) 1960 Mireille Darc José Bénazéraf
"Mourir d'amour", song by Frédéric François from 20 Ans D'olympia 2008

See also
Mourir d'aimer
Morir de amor (disambiguation)